In enzymology, a N-acylsphingosine galactosyltransferase is an enzyme that catalyzes the chemical reaction

UDP-galactose + N-acylsphingosine  UDP + D-galactosylceramide

Thus, the two substrates of this enzyme are UDP-galactose and N-acylsphingosine, whereas its two products are UDP and D-galactosylceramide.

This enzyme belongs to the family of glycosyltransferases, specifically the hexosyltransferases.  The systematic name of this enzyme class is UDP-galactose:N-acylsphingosine D-galactosyltransferase. Other names in common use include UDP galactose-N-acylsphingosine galactosyltransferase, and uridine diphosphogalactose-acylsphingosine galactosyltransferase.  This enzyme participates in sphingolipid metabolism.

References

 

EC 2.4.1
Enzymes of unknown structure